How Many Times can refer to the following songs with that title:

 "How Many Times" (Family Brown song), from Life and Times 1982-1989 (1990)
 How Many Times (DJ Khaled song)", 2015
 A song in Halloween Is Grinch Night 
 A song by Toto from Kingdom of Desire
 "How Many Times?", a song by Insane Clown Posse on the album The Great Milenko
 A song by Aretha Franklin from A Rose Is Still a Rose (1998)
 A song by Kate Ryan from Alive
 A song by Tinashe from Aquarius (2014)
 A song by K. Michelle (2011)
 "How Many Times", a song by Irving Berlin